Nathaniel Ohene Asamoah (born February 22, 1990) is a Ghanaian football striker who last played for FC Banants.

Club career 
Born in Accra, Nathaniel Ohene Asamoah began his professional career with All Stars. In January 2011 he joined Asante Kotoko. A year later, in February 2012, he signed a contract with Serbian club Red Star Belgrade. He returned to Ghana when his contract expired at the end of the 2012–13 season. In September 2013, Asamoah joined Medeama. In the 2015 Ghana premier league season, he scored 18 goals trailing one goal to the top scorer title to Kofi Owusu. In August 2015, he signed at Raja Casablanca.

On 26 July 2018, Asamoah signed for FC Banants, being released by mutual consent on 1 June 2019.

International career
In second half of 2011 Asamoah received a call up for Ghana national team against Swaziland and Brazil, but hasn't entered the game in any of those occasions.

He finally made a debut for Ghana on May 25, 2015, in a friendly match against Madagascar.

Career statistics

Club

Honours
Red Star
Serbian Cup (1): 2011–12

Medeama
Ghanaian FA Cup: 2015
Ghana Super Cup: 2015

References

External links 
 Nathaniel Asamoah on Red Star official website
 

1990 births
Living people
Footballers from Accra
Ghanaian footballers
Ghana international footballers
Association football forwards
Legon Cities FC players
Asante Kotoko S.C. players
Red Star Belgrade footballers
Raja CA players
Medeama SC players
Serbian SuperLiga players
Ghanaian expatriate footballers
Expatriate footballers in Serbia
Aduana Stars F.C. players